, also known as Horikawa-dono and Tōtōmi-kō, was a Japanese statesman, courtier and politician during the Heian period.

Career
Kanemichi served as a minister during the reign of Emperor En'yū.  His chief rival was his younger brother, Kaneie, who was also raised to the position of regent during a different time frame.

 972 (Tenroku 3, 11th month):  Kanemichi is elevated to the concurrent offices of nadaijin and kampaku.
 974 (Ten'en 2, 2nd month): Kenemichi is named Daijō Daijin.
 December 20, 977 (Jōgen 2, 8th day of the 11th month): Kanemichi dies at the age of 51.

Genealogy
This member of the Fujiwara clan was the son of Morosuke. He was the second son. The Honda clan claims descent from him.

Kanemichi had four brothers: Kaneie,  Kinsue,  Koretada, and Tamemitsu.

Notes

References
 Brinkley, Frank and Dairoku Kikuchi. (1915). A History of the Japanese People from the Earliest Times to the End of the Meiji Era. New York: Encyclopædia Britannica. OCLC 413099
 Nussbaum, Louis-Frédéric and Käthe Roth. (2005).  Japan encyclopedia. Cambridge: Harvard University Press. ;  OCLC 58053128
 Titsingh, Isaac. (1834). Nihon Odai Ichiran; ou,  Annales des empereurs du Japon.  Paris: Royal Asiatic Society, Oriental Translation Fund of Great Britain and Ireland. OCLC 5850691

925 births
977 deaths
Fujiwara clan
Regents of Japan